Osmose is a conservation organization in Cambodia.

They are active against the invasive water hyacinth and support conservation of waterfowl.

External links
http://www.osmosetonlesap.net/english/accueil.php

Nature conservation organisations based in Asia
Environmental organisations based in Cambodia